Iva Bittová (born 22 July 1958) is a Czech avant-garde violinist, singer, and composer. She began her career as an actor in the mid-1970s, appearing in several Czech feature films, but switched to playing violin and singing in the early 1980s. She started recording in 1986 and by 1990 her unique vocal and instrumental technique gained her international recognition. Since then, she has performed regularly throughout Europe, the United States and Japan, and has released over eight solo albums.

In addition to her musical career, Bittová has continued acting and still occasionally appears in feature films. In 2003 she played the part of Zena in Želary, a film nominated for Best Foreign Language Film at the 2004 Academy Awards.

Biography 
Iva Bittová was born on 22 July 1958 in the town of Bruntál, Czech Silesia, in what was then the Czechoslovak Republic. The second of three daughters, she grew up in a musical family where her father Koloman Bitto, a famous musician of Hungarian–Indian origin from southern Slovakia, played guitar, trumpet and double bass in folk and classical ensembles, and her mother Lidmila Bittová (née Masařová) sang in professional vocal groups. As a child, Bittová took ballet and violin lessons in Opava and played child roles in the Silesian Theatre of Zdeněk Nejedlý. When her family moved to Brno in 1971, she dropped music in favour of drama and studied at the Brno Conservatory. For the next ten years, Bittová worked as an actress, appearing in several Czech feature films and Brno television and radio productions.

In the early 1980s, Bittová returned to music and studied violin under Rudolf Šťastný, a teacher at JAMU, the Janáček Academy in Brno. She had received her vocal training while studying drama and soon developed unique vocal and violin styles. In 1985, Bittová collaborated with percussionist Pavel Fajt from the Czech rock group Dunaj and recorded Bittová + Fajt, a fusion of alternative rock music with Slavic and Romani music. She then recorded a few solo EPs in 1986 and sang with Dunaj for the next few years. Her breakthrough came in 1987 when she and Fajt recorded their second album Svatba (The Wedding), which was released internationally by Review Records. This attracted the attention of English percussionist Chris Cutler of Recommended Records, who re-issued Bittová + Fajt internationally. The duo also attracted the attention of English avant-garde guitarist Fred Frith, who featured them in a documentary film on him, Step Across the Border (1990), which gave them their first broad international exposure and a tour outside of Eastern Europe.

In 2015, she graduated from Masaryk University in Brno having undertaken a bachelor program in early music. In 2018, she was awarded a master's degree in musicology by the same university. She received a Peter S. Reed Foundation grant in 2018.

Bittová recorded her first full-length solo album Iva Bittová in 1991, followed by River of Milk, her first United States release. In 1997, she began exploring classical music with a series of concerts and recording an album of Béla Bartók's violin duets. Leoš Janáček Moravian folk poetry in songs, Slovak Songs by Béla Bartók, Alfred Schnittke's Faustus Cantata. She collaborated with Vladimír Václavek to record a double album Bílé Inferno (White Inferno) in 1997. The success of this release led to Bittová and Václavek establishing Čikori, an association of musicians involved in improvisational music.

Bittová has performed with a number of avant-garde musicians internationally, including Fred Frith, Chris Cutler and Tom Cora, Bill Frissel, Marc Ribot, Hamid Drake, Evan Ziporyn, Bobby McFerrin and has given solo concerts across the world. Bittová lived in the village of Lelekovice near Brno with her two sons, Matouš and Antonín. She now resides in Rhinebeck, New York, with her son Antonín.

Her ancestors come from India. Her son's name (Matouš) means "gift by God". It comes from Hebrew name Matthiyah. Her name means "yew" in Germanic languages.

Bittová's music 
Bittová's music is a blend of rock and East European music which she describes as "my own personal folk music". Her violin playing mixes different techniques, including playing the strings with various objects and plucking them like a banjo. Her vocal utterances range from traditional singing to chirping, cackling and deep throat noises. She puts her whole body into her performances, drawing on her theatrical skills. AllMusic.com writes: "Her irresistible charm, original use of voice, and fondness of melodies that sit on the border of avant-garde and playground nursery rhymes won her devoted fans around the world."
Iva Bittová's countryman Milan Kundera from Brno, wrote how Europe's "small nations" form another Europe. The violinist-vocalist may be a "small nation" Czech but her musical worldview and visionary creativity acknowledge no borders. Her powers of spontaneous creativity are more bountiful than it is fair to confer on one person. Witness and marvel. 
50 words by Ken Hunt.

Repertoire with different composers

Sprechstimme in Pierrot Lunaire Arnold Schönberg

Kontraalt in "Seid nüchtern und wachet..." Alfred Schnittke

Mezzo-soprano in Folk songs Luciano Berio

Canto in Kafka-Fragmente Georgy Kurtág

Canto in Frankenstein!! HK Gruber

Arabic voice in Stabat Mater Karl Jenkins

Discography

Collaborations 
 With Pavel Fajt
 Bittová + Fajt (1987, LP, Panton)
 Svatba (The Wedding) (1987, LP, Review)
 With Dunaj
 Dunaj a Iva Bittová (1989, LP, Panton)
 Pustit Musíš (You Must Let Go) (1996, CD, Rachot Behemot)
 With Dorothea Kellerová
 Béla Bartók: 44 dueta pro dvoje housle (44 Duets for Two Violins) (1997, CD, Rachot Behemot)
 With Vladimír Václavek
 Bílé inferno (White Inferno) (1997, 2xCD, Indies)
 With Škampa Quartet
 Classic (1998, CD, Supraphon)
 Janáček: Moravian Folk Poetry in Songs (2004, CD, Supraphon)
 With the Netherlands Wind Ensemble
 Dance of the Vampires (2000, CD, N.W.E.)
 With Andreas Kröper
 Echoes (2001, CD, Supraphon)
 With Čikori
 Čikori (2001, CD, Indies)
 With DJ Javas
 The Party (2004, CD, Indies)
 With Miloš Valent, Marek Štryncl, Solamente Naturali, Bratislava Conservatory Choir
 Vladimír Godár: Mater (2006, CD, ECM)
 With Bang on a Can
 Elida (2006, CD, Indies)
 With Susumu Yokota
 Wonder Waltz (2006, CD, Skintone (J), Lo (UK))
 With George Mraz, Emil Viklický and Lolo Tropp
 Moravian Gems (2007, CD, Cube Metier)
 With Prague Philharmonia
 Zvon (2012, CD, Supraphon)
With Timothy Hill, David Rothenberg "New Cicada Trio:
Live in Beacon (2017, CD, Terra Nova Music)

Solo 
 Iva Bittová (1986, EP, Panton)
 Balada pro banditu (A Ballad for a Bandit) (1986, EP, Panton)
 Iva Bittová (1991, LP, Pavian)
 River of Milk (1991, CD, EVA)
 Ne, nehledej (No, Do Not Seek) (1994, CD, BMG)
 Kolednice (Carol singer) (1995, CD, BMG)
 Divná slečinka (A Strange Young Lady) (1996, CD, BMG)
 Solo (1997, CD, Nonesuch)
 Iva Bittová (2013, CD, ECM)
 Entwine / Proplétám (2014, CD, Pavian Records)

Filmography 
 Ružové sny (Rosy Dreams) (1976)
 Die Insel der Silberreiher (Island of the Silver Herons) (1976)
 Jak se budí princezny (1977)
 Balada pro Banditu (Ballad for a Bandit) (1978)
 L. Janáček: Zápisník zmizelého (1980)
 Únos Moravanky (1983)
 Mikola a Mikolko (1988)
 Něha (Tenderness) (1991)
 The Man Who Cried (as the voice for Christina Ricci) (2000)
 Želary (2003)
 Tajnosti (Little Girl Blue) (2007)

Footnotes

External links 

 Official homepage.
 . Czech Music Information Centre.
 Videos of Iva Bittová performing live.
 .
 .

1958 births
Living people
Czech classical musicians
Czechoslovak women singers
Czech film actresses
Czech film score composers
Czech folk musicians
Czech people of Hungarian descent
Czech people of Indian descent
Indian women singer-songwriters
Indian singer-songwriters
Masaryk University alumni
Nonesuch Records artists
Czech violinists
Experimental musicians
People from Bruntál
People of Hungarian-Romani descent
Sun in a Net Awards winners
21st-century violinists
21st-century Czech women singers
Brno Conservatory alumni